Nyishi (Kamle) or Sarak is a Tani language of India. It is spoken in Arunachal Pradesh by an estimated 9,000 people of the Nyishi tribe. It appears to be a dialect of the Nishi language.

Though Hili Miri is listed under Mising [mrg] in Ethnologue, Burling and Sun–experts on the Aranuchal Pradesh and Tani languages–treat Hill Miri and Mising as separate and distinct languages belonging to different branches of the Tani subgroup.

Description
Nyishi (muri-mugli) is a member of the Tani branch of the Sino-Tibetan languages and is considered a dialect of the Nishi language. It is spoken by 9,000 people in the northern regions of India by the Nyishi people of Kamle. It is threatened because the younger generation is slowly breaking away from their people's traditions and language. Many audio books of gospel narratives in the Nyishi language of Kamle have been collected.

History of scholarship
George Abraham Grierson, in his survey of India regarding its linguistics, researched the Nyishi language and published a record over a century ago.

Phonology

Consonants
The following table includes an inventory of Nyishi (Kamle) consonants.

Vowels are front , central , and back .  Vowels occur long and short.

Grammar

The basic Nyishi (Kamle) grammar and basic word order are like those of related Sino-Tibetan languages, similar to that of Nishi.

Numerals

Pronouns

Personal

References

Further reading
Ivan Martin Simon, "Hill Miri language guide", Govt. of Arunachal Pradesh, 1976
Matthew S. Dryer, "Word order in Tibeto-burman languages" Linguistics of the Tibeto-Burman Area, 2008
Shri Aduk Tayeng, "Nishi Phrase book", Arunachal Pradesh, 1990
P. T. Abraham, "A Grammar of Nyishi Language", 2005
S. N. Goswami, "Nishing ( Bangni) Language Guide", 1995

External links
Hill Miri profile at the Endangered Languages Project
Gospel narratives in Hill Miri dialect

Languages of Assam
Tani languages
Endangered languages of India
Endangered Sino-Tibetan languages